Steve Olesen (born 22 December 1993) is a Danish badminton player.

Achievements

BWF International Challenge/Series (4 runners-up) 
Men's doubles

Mixed doubles

  BWF International Challenge tournament
  BWF International Series tournament
  BWF Future Series tournament

References

External links 
 

1993 births
Living people
Danish male badminton players